Omerta 6/12 (in the US release as Attack on Finland) is a 2021 Finnish action thriller film directed by Aku Louhimies, based on Ilkka Remes' 2006 novel . It tells the story of an attack planned by Serb terrorists on the Presidential Palace during the reception of Independence Day. The film was originally to be directed by Antti J. Jokinen but having fallen ill, Jokinen was replaced by Louhimies. The film stars Jasper Pääkkönen as the main character Max Tanner, an agent representing SUPO in the European Joint Police Operations. Other roles are played by Nanna Blondell, Sverrir Gudnason, Cathy Belton, Juhan Ulfsak, Dragomir Mrsic, Slaven Spanovic, Märt and Priit Pius, and Mirtel Pohla.

The production of the film went through numerous issues, one being security problems which led to the then-director Jokinen not being allowed into the filming area. Louhimies having been replaced by Jokinen, the script was completely rewritten. The film was planned to be the first part of Omerta series which was supposed to consist of two films and a six-part tv series. Due to the film's troublesome production, the sequel was abandoned and the tv series was reduced into four episodes.

The film premiered on 19 November 2021.

Premise
The reception for Finland's Independence Day in the capital city Helsinki is rudely interrupted when the presidential palace is attacked by the Serb terrorists and the state leadership, including President Koskivuo (Robert Enckell), is taken hostage. Max Tanner (Jasper Pääkkönen) of the Security Police is appointed as a negotiator in the hostage crisis, that unfolds as part of a bigger plan to undermine European security. Tanner must make bold and painful decisions to protect lives and the future of Europe.

Cast

Release
The film had its international premiere on 19 November 2021. It was theatrically released in North America and on VOD by Samuel Goldwyn Films on 1 July 2022.

Reception

Box office
Omerta 6/12 grossed $0 in North America, and a worldwide total of $958,440.

Critical response
On review aggregator Rotten Tomatoes, the film holds an approval rating of 46% based on 13 reviews, with an average rating of 4.8/10.

See also
 Farewell, Mr. President

References

External links
 
 
 
 Omerta 6/12 - official teaser on YouTube

2021 films
2021 action thriller films
Films about terrorism in Europe
Films based on Finnish novels
Films directed by Aku Louhimies
Films set in Helsinki
Films shot in Finland
Finnish action thriller films